The King's School is a co-educational independent Christian school in Witney, Oxfordshire, England that is part of Oxfordshire Community Churches (OCC). The school had 163 pupils at the time of its last Full Inspection and now has upward of 200. The ISI inspection in Dec 2018 found the school fully compliant with all regulations. The school is known for the strength of its Christian ethos in delivering a Christian Education with strong academic results. It has maintained the cheapest level of fees for similar schools in the south of England due to the support of the Oxfordshire Community Churches and the high level of parent and community volunteering.

History
The King's School was started in 1984 by the OCC group of churches with David Freeman as the founding principal.  The school had several locations between 1984 and 1989. The school was first based at Merrifield house then it moved to Scout Houses and even spent some time based at the Cotswold Wildlife Park before a purpose built facility was provided by the churches which includes a large sports hall. The School is on New Yatt Road, Witney.

Extracurricular activities
Among the extracurricular activities at the school are frequent Sports events and educational visits and the Expressive Arts Week. The school works with a local charity, The Besom, in serving local families in need by the secondary pupils providing missional serving activities.

At the end of the summer term, the senior pupils take time off normal lessons as part of their annual Expressive Arts Week. Students display their work on graphics, P.A. and lighting, drama, music, dance, costume and stage design, and make refreshments for the intervals.

To help the students with learning languages and to experience other cultures the school provides exchange trips to both Germany and France along with the Year 11 trip to such countries as Zambia and India.

References

External links
The King's School website

Private schools in Oxfordshire
Witney